Keith A. Kreiman (born June 28, 1954) is an American politician who served as an Iowa State Senator from the 47th District from 2003 to 2011. He received his AA from Ellsworth Community College, his BA from Seattle University, and his JD from the University of Iowa College of Law. He works as an attorney in private practice.

Kreiman served on several committees in the Iowa Senate - the Education committee; the Human Resources committee; the Local Government committee; and the Judiciary committee, where he is chair.  He also served as vice chair of the Health and Human Services Appropriations Subcommittee.  His prior political experience includes serving as a representative in the Iowa House from 1993 to 2003, serving on the Davis County school board from 1989 to 1993, and serving on the State Democratic Platform Committee in 1988.

Kreiman was re-elected in 2006 with 11,790 votes (64%), defeating Republican opponent Keith Caviness and Independent Max Hulen. 

He was defeated in 2010 by Republican Mark Chelgren by 10 votes.

External links
Senator Keith Kreiman official Iowa Legislature site
Senator Keith Kreiman official Iowa General Assembly site
State Senator Keith Kreiman official constituency site

References

|-

Democratic Party Iowa state senators
1954 births
Living people
Politicians from Fargo, North Dakota
Seattle University alumni
University of Iowa College of Law alumni
Iowa lawyers
Democratic Party members of the Iowa House of Representatives
School board members in Iowa
People from Bloomfield, Iowa
Lawyers from Fargo, North Dakota